Shoparjito Shadhinota (English: Self-earned Freedom) is a sculpture by Shamim Sikder commemorating the Bangladesh Liberation war.

History
The sculpture was built in 1990, and is located in Dhaka University. After the statue was inaugurated Islamic extremists had threatened to destroy it.

References

Aftermath of the Bangladesh Liberation War
University of Dhaka
Outdoor sculptures in Bangladesh
Statues